Jernigan is a surname. Notable people with the surname include:

Aaron Jernigan (1813–1891), early U.S. settler
Anna Jernigan ("Anna Jay") (born 1998), American wrestler
Billy Jernigan (1923–1997), American wrestler
Candy Jernigan (1952–1991), U.S. artist and designer
Darren Jernigan (born 1969), U.S. politician
Dennis Jernigan (born 1959), U.S. Christian singer-songwriter
Doug Jernigan (born 1946), U.S. musician
Garrett Jernigan, American physicist and astronomer
Gerald D. Jernigan (1942–2006), U.S. politician
Harry Jernigan, fictional character from The Towering Inferno
Jerrel Jernigan (born 1989), American football player
Johnny Jernigan, American football coach and former player
Joseph Paul Jernigan (1954–1993), U.S. murderer
Kenneth Jernigan (1926–1998), blind U.S. civil rights activist
Kenton Jernigan, U.S. squash player
Tamara E. Jernigan (born 1959), U.S. scientist and astronaut
Terry Jernigan (born 1951/1952), U.S. neuropsychologist
Thomas R. Jernigan (1847–1920), U.S. diplomat, and consul general in Shanghai

See also
Jernigan (1991 novel), by David Gates